The European Men's Youth Handball Championship, is the official competition for youth men's handball national handball teams in Europe, held by the European Handball Federation every second year. Since the 2004 edition, the championship received its current name: EHF European Men's U-18 Handball Championship. 

In addition to crowning the European champions, the tournament also serves as a qualifying tournament for the IHF Youth World Handball Championship.

Tournaments

The European Handball Federation decided to hold an U-19 European Championship in 2021, in a move to lessen the COVID-19 pandemic’s impact for national team players born in 2002.

Medal table

Participating nations

References

External links 
 Eurohandball.com
 History of the EHF Men’s 18 European Championships

 
European Handball Federation competitions
Youth handball
European youth sports competitions
1992 establishments in Europe
Recurring sporting events established in 1992